The recorder has a wide repertoire, both written expressly for it and also adapted for it.  Following is a list of Wikipedia articles on music written expressly for the recorder:

 Recorder Sonata in C major, HWV 365 (Handel)
 Recorder sonata in A minor (HWV 362) (G F Handel)
 Recorder sonata in F major (HWV 369) (G F Handel)
 Recorder sonata in G minor (HWV 360) (G F Handel)
 Recorder sonata in D minor (HWV 367a) (G F Handel)
 Sonata in B minor for flute or recorder and harpsichord BVW 1030 (J S Bach)
 Sonata in E-flat major for flute or recorder and harpsichord BVW 1031 (J S Bach)
 Sonata in C major for flute or recorder and basso continuo BVW 1033 (J S Bach)
 Sonata in E major for flute or recorder and basso continuo BVW 1035 (J S Bach)
 Sonata in A major for flute or recorder and harpsichord BVW 1032 (J S Bach)
 Sonata in E minor for flute or recorder and basso continuo BVW 1034 (J S Bach)

Recorders (musical instruments)